Psychomotor agitation is a symptom in various disorders and health conditions. It is characterized by unintentional and purposeless motions and restlessness, often but not always accompanied by emotional distress. Typical manifestations include pacing around, wringing of the hands, uncontrolled tongue movement, pulling off clothing and putting it back on, and other similar actions. In more severe cases, the motions may become harmful to the individual, and may involve things such as ripping, tearing, or chewing at the skin around one's fingernails, lips, or other body parts to the point of bleeding. Psychomotor agitation is typically found in various mental disorders, especially in psychotic and mood disorders. It can be a result of drug intoxication or withdrawal. It can also be caused by severe hyponatremia. The middle-aged and the elderly are more at risk to express it.

Psychomotor agitation overlaps with agitation generally, such as agitation in predementia and dementia; see Agitation (dementia) for details.

Signs and symptoms 
People experiencing psychomotor agitation may feel the following emotions or do the following actions. Some of these actions are not inherently bad or maladaptive, but they can have maladaptively excessive versions. For example, self-hugging can be therapeutically advisable, but self-hugging as a component of a set of motor agitation movements is a sign of psychomotor agitation.
 unable to sit still
 fidgeting
 as if their body is stiff
 unable to relieve tension
 desperate to find a comfortable position
 increasingly anxious
 exasperated
 tearful
 extreme irritability, like snapping at friends and family, or being annoyed by small things
 anger
 agitation
 racing thoughts and incessant talking
 restlessness
 pacing
 hand-wringing
 self-hugging
 nail-biting
 outbursts of complaining or shouting
 pulling at clothes or hair
 picking at skin, as either a sign of PMA or even progressing to a disorder (excoriation disorder)
 tapping fingers
 tapping feet
 starting and stopping tasks abruptly
 talking very quickly
 moving objects around for no reason
 taking off clothes then putting them back on

Causes
Causes include:
 Schizophrenia
 Bipolar disorder
 Excited delirium
 Post-traumatic stress disorder (PTSD)
 Panic attacks
 Anxiety disorder
 Obsessive-compulsive disorder (OCD)
 Nicotine withdrawal
 Alcohol withdrawal
 Opioid Withdrawal
 Autism
 Asperger syndrome
 Claustrophobia
 Intellectual disability
 Attention deficit hyperactivity disorder
 Dementia
 Parkinson's disease
 Traumatic brain injury
 Alzheimer's disease
 Acute intermittent porphyria
 Hereditary coproporphyria
 Variegate porphyria
 Side effects of drugs like cocaine or methylphenidate
 Side effects of antipsychotics like haloperidol
 Major depressive disorder
 Agitated depression 
 SSRI or SNRI medications
As explained in a 2008 study, in people with mood disorders there is a dynamic link between their mood and the way they move.

People showing signs of psychomotor agitation may be experiencing mental tension and anxiety, which comes out physically as:
 fast or repetitive movements
 movements that have no purpose
 movements that are not intentional

These activities are the subconscious mind's way of trying to relieve tension. Often people experiencing psychomotor agitation feel as if their movements are not deliberate.

Sometimes, however, psychomotor agitation does not relate to mental tension and anxiety.

Recent studies found that nicotine withdrawal induces psychomotor agitation (motor deficit).

In other cases, psychomotor agitation can be caused by antipsychotic medications. For instance, akathisia, a movement disorder sometimes induced by antipsychotics and other psychotropics, is estimated to affect 15-35% of patients with schizophrenia.

Diagnosis

Treatment
A form of self-treatment arises in that many patients develop stimming in a natural, unplanned, and largely nonconscious way, simply because they coincidentally discover behavior that brings some relief to their psychomotor agitation, and develop habits around it. Stimming has many forms, some quite adaptive and others maladaptive (for example, excessive hand-wringing can injure joints, and excessive rubbing or scratching of skin can injure it). Another form of self-treatment that arises not uncommonly is self-medication, which unfortunately can lead to substance use disorders such as alcohol use disorder.

Whereas stimming is a nonpharmacologic but undirected and sometimes harmful amelioration, directed therapy tries to introduce another and generally better nonpharmacologic help in the form of the following lifestyle changes, to help a person to reduce their anxiety levels:
 regular exercise
 yoga and meditation
 deep breathing exercises

Because nonpharmacologic treatment by itself is often not enough, medications are also often used. Intramuscular midazolam, lorazepam, or another benzodiazepine can be used both to sedate agitated patients and to control semi-involuntary muscle movements in cases of suspected akathisia.

Droperidol, haloperidol, or other typical antipsychotics can decrease the duration of agitation caused by acute psychosis, but should be avoided if the agitation is suspected to be akathisia, which can be potentially worsened. Also using promethazine may be useful. Recently, three atypical antipsychotics, olanzapine, aripiprazole and ziprasidone, have become available and FDA approved as an instant release intramuscular injection formulations to control acute agitation. The IM formulations of these three atypical antipsychotics are considered to be at least as effective or even more effective than the IM administration of haloperidol alone or haloperidol with lorazepam (which is the standard treatment of agitation in most hospitals) and the atypicals have a dramatically improved tolerability due to a milder side-effect profile.

In those with psychosis causing agitation, there is a lack of support for the use of benzodiazepines alone, however they are commonly used in combination with antipsychotics since they can prevent side effects associated with dopamine antagonists.

See also 
 Agitation (dementia)
 Akathisia
 Body-focused repetitive behavior
 Excited delirium

References

External links 

Symptoms and signs of mental disorders